Sue Scherer (born August 27, 1956) played for the Canadian National women's ice hockey team from 1989 to 1992. Scherer was a team member on Canada's National Team in two sports, ice hockey and softball.

Playing career
The Kitchener native was a catcher in softball. She was part of the Canadian national softball team that took fourth in the World Championships in New Zealand in 1986 and fifth at the World Championships in Taiwan in 1982. Scherer also competed with the softball team at the Pan American Games. At the Pan Am games, she won gold in 1981 and 1983, and bronze in 1987.

In ice hockey, she was team captain for Canada at the 1990 World Championships. She would play for Canada again in 1992 and claim another gold.

Coaching
From 1993 to 1996, Scherer was the head coach for the Guelph Gryphons women's ice hockey program. One of her players was Cassie Campbell.

Awards and honours
Letterwinner, Guelph Hockey, 1983–84
 Johnny F. Bassett Memorial Award
 OWIAA All-Star selection, 1982–83
 OWIAA All-Star selection, 1983–84
Softball Canada Hall of Fame in 1997.
 University of Guelph's Hall of Fame 1991
 Waterloo Region Hall of Fame

References

1956 births
Living people
Canadian women's ice hockey players